Liu Wanting and Sun Shengnan were the defending champions and seeded third, but lost in the semifinals to Chan Hao-ching and Rika Fujiwara.

Second seeds Chan Hao-ching and Rika Fujiwara won the title, they defeated the first seeds Kimiko Date-Krumm and Zhang Shuai in the final 4–6, 6–4, [10–7].

Seeds

Draw

Draw

References
 Main Draw

Blossom Cup - Singles
Industrial Bank Cup